Maria Homolova (born , Zvolen) is a former Slovak female artistic gymnast and member of the national team.  She participated at the 2012 Summer Olympics in London, United Kingdom.  This was her first Olympic Games, having narrowly missed qualifying for both the Athens and Beijing Games (missing out in 2008 by three one-hundredths of a point).  After suffering many injuries during her career (including a damaged Achillies tendon in the run up to the 2008 Olympics), she retired after the 2012 Olympics.

She was the 2004, 2005, 2006, 2011 and 2011 Slovakian national gymnastics champion in the all-around.  She was also junior champion in 2000, 2001 and 2003.

She has studied Media Communications.

References

External links
http://theolympicssports.com/other-sports/athlete-profile-%E2%80%93-maria-homolova-svk.html
http://www.gymnastics.sk/wiw/homolova.html
https://www.youtube.com/watch?v=Dh1kBbwK6uM

1987 births
Living people
Slovak female artistic gymnasts
Gymnasts at the 2012 Summer Olympics
Olympic gymnasts of Slovakia
Sportspeople from Zvolen